Jösse Car was a sports car manufacturer founded in 1994 and located in Arvika, Sweden.

They are most famous for creating the two-seat open-top Indigo 3000 car. This car is powered by a Volvo 3.0-litre six-cylinder engine giving a top speed of 250 km/h with a rear-wheel drive powertrain. The body is of composite panels attached to a space frame. The front suspension is a walking beam design with a transverse composite leaf spring and the rear suspension is a Volvo multilink using a transverse composite leaf spring.

History
October 1993 Bengt Lidmalm gets the idea for his own sportscar when visiting the TVR showroom at Earl’s Court.
February 1994 Jösse Car AB was founded, Head office in Arvika.
March 1994 Bengt Lidmalm and Sven-Olof Fogelberg starts the construction of the first chassis.
October 1994 First prototype presented.
1995 First prototype driven, two more prototypes were built.
May 1995 The car passes crash testing at the Swedish VTI institute.
June 1995 A decision was made to start series production of the Indigo 3000.
September 1995 Engine emissions testing completed.
1 March 1996 Production started. Only three cars were built.
June 1996 First car delivered to a customer.
September 1996 JC Indigo 3000 was awarded "Utmärkt Svensk Form" ('Excellent Swedish Design').
October 1997 Unveiling of new factory in Åmål, a total of twelve cars were built in Arvika.
January 1998 Last car was built late in the year.
January 2001 Last car delivered to a customer on 11 January 1999.
March 2003 Jösse Car AB was declared bankrupt. A grand total of forty-four cars were built.

External links
 Jösse Car - Official website

Defunct motor vehicle manufacturers of Sweden
Sports car manufacturers